eFront Alternative Investment Solutions is a software provider to the financial industry. Headquartered in Paris, France, eFront employs more than 700 people worldwide. eFront's solutions serve more than 850 customers in 48 countries, including companies in the private equity, real estate investment, banking, and insurance sectors.

In 2018, eFront was recognised as one of the top 100 global providers of financial technology, by IDC FinTech rankings. eFront was the only provider solely dedicated to Alternative investments to appear in the ranking.

In 2019, the company was acquired by BlackRock. The company now operates as a specialised business unit within BlackRock Solutions, alongside Aladdin Institutional and Aladdin Wealth.

Operations 
eFront has a portfolio of products for different investor types, such as:

 Limited partners
 General partners
 Asset servicers (fund administrators), 
 Fund of funds 
 Venture capital

eFront's product portfolio also covers different asset classes, such as: 

 Private equity
 Real estate
 Infrastructure 
 Private debt.

History
 2019: eFront was acquired by BlackRock.
 2015: eFront was acquired by Bridgepoint.
 2013: eFront acquired software provider AnalytX.
 2012: eFront acquired DMLT, the developer of the Investment Café, now called eFront Investment Café.
 2011: eFront was acquired by Francisco Partners.
 2008: International expansion throughout North America and Asia-Pacific.
 2006: eFront went public with an IPO on Alternext.
 2003: International expansion throughout Europe and Middle East.
 2002: first product launch, eFront Venture (eFront Invest today).
 1999: eFront was founded in 1999 as technology platform.

References

Software companies of France